Maria Araújo Kahn (born August 20, 1964) is an American lawyer who is serving as a United States circuit judge of the United States Court of Appeals for the Second Circuit. She previously served as an associate justice of the Connecticut Supreme Court from 2017 to 2023.

Early life and education

Kahn was born in 1964 in Benguela, Angola to Portuguese parents. She immigrated to the United States when she was ten years old and speaks fluent Portuguese and Spanish. She earned a Bachelor of Arts degree from New York University in 1986 and her Juris Doctor from Fordham University School of Law in 1989.

Career 

Kahn clerked for Judge Peter Collins Dorsey of the U.S. District Court for the District of Connecticut before briefly serving as a public defender for the State of Connecticut. She then served as an Assistant United States Attorney prosecuting medical fraud, computer fraud, and white collar criminal cases. She was also an adjunct professor at the University of Connecticut School of Law. From 1993 to 1997, Kahn was a staff attorney at the Connecticut Office of Protection and Advocacy for Individuals with Disabilities.

Connecticut Superior Court 
Kahn was appointed to the New Haven County Superior Court in April 2006.

Consideration for federal district court 
In February 2013, Kahn was named as one of five finalists being considered for nomination to a seat on the United States District Court for the District of Connecticut left vacant when Judge Mark Kravitz died in September 2012.

Connecticut Appellate Court 
On May 2, 2017, Governor Dannel Malloy nominated Kahn to the Connecticut Appellate Court. Her appointment and confirmation created a female majority on the court.

Connecticut Supreme Court 
On October 4, 2017, Governor Malloy nominated Kahn to the Connecticut Supreme Court. She was confirmed and sworn into office on November 1, 2017.

Federal judicial service 

On July 29, 2022, President Joe Biden announced his intent to nominate Kahn to serve as a United States circuit judge of the United States Court of Appeals for the Second Circuit. On August 1, 2022, her nomination was sent to the Senate. President Biden nominated Kahn to the seat to be vacated by Judge José A. Cabranes, who will assume senior status upon confirmation of a successor. On September 21, 2022, a hearing on her nomination was held before the Senate Judiciary Committee. On December 1, 2022, her nomination was reported out of committee by a 12–10 vote. On January 3, 2023, her nomination was returned to the President under Rule XXXI, Paragraph 6 of the United States Senate; she was renominated later the same day. On February 2, 2023, her nomination was reported out of committee by an 11–9 vote. On February 16, 2023, the Senate invoked cloture on her nomination by a 50–44 vote. On March 9, 2023, her nomination was confirmed by a 51–42 vote. She received her judicial commission on March 10, 2023.

See also 
 List of African-American federal judges
 List of African-American jurists

References

External links
 
 
 Official Biography on Supreme Court website

|-

1964 births
Living people
20th-century American judges
20th-century American lawyers
20th-century American women lawyers
20th-century American women judges
21st-century American judges
21st-century American women judges
African-American judges
Angolan emigrants to the United States
Angolan people of Portuguese descent
Assistant United States Attorneys
Connecticut lawyers
Fordham University School of Law alumni
Judges of the Connecticut Appellate Court
Judges of the United States Court of Appeals for the Second Circuit
Justices of the Connecticut Supreme Court
New York University alumni
Public defenders
Superior court judges in the United States
United States court of appeals judges appointed by Joe Biden